Bush rat may refer to several rat species:
Rattus fuscipes, the Australian bush rat
Aethomys, the African bush rats, also known as rock rats or rock mice
Golunda ellioti, the Indian bush rat
Hadromys, the Manipur and Yunnan bush rats
Neotoma floridana, also known as the eastern woodrat or Florida woodrat

Animal common name disambiguation pages